Black hair is the darkest and most common of all human hair colors globally, due to larger populations with this dominant trait. It is a dominant genetic trait, and it is found in people of all backgrounds and ethnicities. Black hair contains a large amount of eumelanin pigmentation, a type of melanin. This hair type contains a much more dense quantity of eumelanin in comparison to other hair colors, such as brown, blonde and red.  In English, various types of black hair are sometimes described as soft-black, raven black, or jet-black. The range of skin colors associated with black hair is vast, ranging from the palest of light skin tones to dark skin. Black-haired humans can have dark or light eyes.

Distribution

Black hair is known to be the most common in the countries of Asia and Africa. Though this characteristic can also be seen in people of Southern Europe and France, it is less common. People of Celtic heritage in Ireland with such traits are sometimes known as the "Black Irish". Black hair can come in a variety of textures, just as any hair color. Generally, the East Asian population has straight, black hair with a very thick cuticle layer and South Asians have thick, wavy or curly hair, while the general hair type seen in black African hair is thick, curly and dense with more hair growing from the head. The curly quality comes from the shape of the hair follicle, as straight hair grows from more circular hair follicles, and curly hair grows from more oval-like follicles.

Hair is naturally reflective, so black hair is not completely dark in bright light. However, the darkest shade will not have a warm, neutral tone but a sheen which can seem almost blue, like the iridescence of a raven's wing; hence, sometimes referred to as raven-black. Jet black hair appears to have reflective silver color in bright sunlight.

Genetics 

Native Americans, East Asian, Southeast Asian, Southwest Asian, Middle Eastern, Far East Russian, South Asian and Himalayan black-haired people
have thicker hair due to the derived EDAR gene allele that is linked to thicker and potentially straighter hair in some parts of Asia, and shovel-shaped incisors. The derived EDAR gene arose approximately 30,000 years ago in China. One study shows that Paleo-Indians had both variants of the EDAR gene, the derived G-allele and the ancestral A-allele. When they tested ancient DNA remains found in the Americas of the individuals named USR1, Anzick-1 and Laranjal-6700 the results showed that they carried the ancestral A-allele.

11,000-year-old remains of Cuncaicha and Lauricocha individuals from South America share alleles at the highest rate with present-day Amerindians, indicating that the derived G-allele increased in frequency in parallel with the ancestral A-allele.

One of the most studied genes that produce brown hair is MC1R, which helps the body to produce the melanocortin protein. This protein in turn helps the body’s hair follicles to produce the type of melanin called eumelanin. To have black hair, one must have genetically inherited this gene from both of their parents, and brown hair is achieved when it is inherited from one parent. This gene is demographically common, as 90% of the total world population carries this gene. Black hair, along with brown hair, comes to turn grey in old age as the hair follicles can no longer produce the pigmentation, but the cause of this inability has yet to be determined.

Gallery

See also
 Brown hair
 Hair dye
 Human hair color
 Human skin color
 Melanin
 Moreno
 Mustache
 Pigment
 Skin

References

External links

 Black Hair, Still Tangled in Politics

Hair color